The 2015 TCR International Series was the inaugural season of the TCR International Series, a motor racing championship for touring cars held across Asia and Europe. The season began at Sepang on 28 March and finished on 22 November at the Guia Circuit in Macau.

Stefano Comini won the drivers' championship, driving a SEAT León Cup Racer, and Target Competition won the teams' championship.

Teams and drivers
Michelin is the official tyre supplier.

Calendar
The provisional 2015 schedule was announced on 31 October 2014. On 13 March 2015, it was announced that the Chilean round, due to be held on 9 August at Autódromo Internacional de Codegua, was postponed to 2016 due to circuit reconstruction. On 17 June 2015 the Argentine round, scheduled for 26 July at Autódromo Juan y Oscar Gálvez, was replaced by the Red Bull Ring due to organisational problems.

Results

Man of the Race
At the end of every weekend, the Race Direction elects a driver who stood out during the event for a particular reason.

Championship standings

Drivers' championship

† – Drivers did not finish the race, but were classified as they completed over 75% of the race distance.

Teams' Championship

† – Drivers did not finish the race, but were classified as they completed over 75% of the race distance.

OMP Trophy
All drivers displaying an OMP are eligible for the  OMP Trophy. Points are awarded for championships and the use of OMP safety equipment. At the end of the season, the top four drivers win a cash prize.

References

External links
 

 
2015
2015 in motorsport